Bosnian smoked cheese ( or ) is a type of very dry piquant low-fat smoked cheese originating from Bosnia and Herzegovina. It is usually home-made product, but industrial production also exists.

History
Northern Bosnia and Herzegovina has a rich agricultural history. Farmers in the region became skilled in the techniques of smoking and salting as methods of meat preservation prior to the introduction of commercial refrigeration, and used these methods to develop local meat dishes such as suho meso. Smoking was also adopted in the production of dairy products, including cheese. Similar smoked cheeses are also found in other countries in the Balkans, including Croatia and Serbia.

Popularity and consumption
Bosnian smoked cheese is usually consumed as a supplement to the main and side dishes, or as a substitute for other cheese variations.

Also see
List of Bosnia and Herzegovina cheeses

References

Smoked cheeses
Bosnia and Herzegovina cheeses
Bosnia and Herzegovina cuisine